Supercruise is sustained supersonic flight of a supersonic aircraft without using afterburner (also known as "reheat"). Many supersonic military aircraft are not capable of supercruise and can only maintain Mach 1+ flight in short bursts with afterburners. Aircraft such as the SR-71 Blackbird are designed to cruise at supersonic speed with afterburners enabled.

Some fighter jets are capable of supercruise but only at high altitudes and in a clean configuration, so the term may imply "a significant increase in effective combat speed with a full weapons load over existing types". One of the pre-eminent military examples of supercuise is the F-22 Raptor, for which supercruise was defined as "the ability to cruise at speeds of one and a half times the speed of sound or greater without the use of afterburner for extended periods in combat configuration."

One of the best-known examples of an aircraft capable of supercruise was Concorde. Due to its long service as a commercial airliner, Concorde holds the record for the most time spent supersonic; more than all other aircraft combined.

History 

A few early supersonic aircraft attained speeds just beyond the speed of sound without using afterburning.

On 3August 1954, a Gerfaut research aircraft powered by an SNECMA Atar 101D2A engine exceeded Mach1 in level flight without using afterburning.

The first production aircraft to exceed Mach1 in level flight without afterburning was the Lockheed F-104 Starfighter after its J65 engine was replaced with a J79. The maximum speed without afterburning was Mach1.05.

The P.1 prototype of the English Electric Lightning, powered by non-afterburning Armstrong Siddeley Sapphire engines, exceeded Mach1 on 11August 1954. A week previously, on 4August, the P.1, WG760 flown by Roland Beamont on its maiden flight, had unknowingly exceeded Mach1 in a climb. During development testing at English Electric it was established that the Lightning had a stabilized speed capability in level flight, without afterburning, of about Mach1.2 and for the  T.4 (2-seat trainer) 1.08. Flying just above the speed of sound without using afterburning, although done by the contractor as part of some flight trials does not appear to have been relevant to the operational capability of the aircraft. Service trials established intercept profiles for subsonic and supersonic targets at different altitudes with subsonic cruising at a maximum of Mach0.95 with all supersonic speeds beyond subsonic cruise attained with afterburning.

All the Fairey Delta 2 initial supersonic test flying to Mach1.1 was done without afterburning. Selecting the afterburner, which initially only had a maximum selection with no intermediate positions, would have caused an uncontrollable rapid acceleration to potentially hazardous speeds, ie too far beyond previously established flutter-free speeds.

Only the supersonic transports (SST), Concorde, and the second version of the Tu-144 (the Tu-144D) spent most of their time cruising at their design speeds without needing afterburning. Afterburning was added to Concorde for take-off to cope with weight increases that came after the initial design. It was also used to accelerate through the high-drag transonic speed range, not because the extra thrust was required, but because it was available and improved the operating economics.

Military use 

The United States Air Force set supercruise as a core requirement for the Advanced Tactical Fighter, which resulted in the F-22 Raptor. The F-22 Raptor's supercruise capabilities are touted as a major performance advantage over other fighters, with supercruise being demonstrated up to at least Mach1.5. Supercruise capability provides advantages for stealth aircraft because an afterburner plume reflects radar signals and creates a significant infrared signature. Virtually all fighters prior to the F-22 cruise at Mach0.8–0.9 while carrying a normal weapons load.

There are a few engines in production that are designed to facilitate tactically significant supercruise:
 The two Pratt & Whitney F119 that power the F-22 Raptor make it the most capable supercruise-capable fighter aircraft in service. The F-22 Raptor can supercruise above Mach 1.5 without external stores.
 The EJ200 engine built by EuroJet Turbo GmbH mounted in the Eurofighter Typhoon. It is capable of supercruising at Mach 1.5 with an air superiority missile load. Typhoon pilots have stated that Mach 1.3 is attainable in combat configuration with external stores.
 The General Electric F414G in the JAS 39 Gripen NG is designed for supercruise and has achieved Mach 1.2, or Mach 1.1 with an air to air missile load.
 The two Snecma M88s that power the Dassault Rafale enable the Rafale to supercruise with four missiles and a belly drop tank.

Independently, Russia is working on Izdelje 30 (after AL31F and AL41F derivatives modifications, like 117S turbofan) and RD33MKRU Morskaja Osa; an all-new AL-41 engine with a complete redesign is underway to add supercruise ability to the Sukhoi Su-57. This has yet to bear fruit, but the stop-gap 117S engine, produced by this program, may achieve the supercruise goal already. While testing a Su-35BM fighter equipped with these engines, it managed to accelerate past Mach 1 without using the afterburner, suggesting that it had supercruise capability. It has yet to be seen whether this will be possible with a combat load.

Aircraft with supercruise ability

References

Citations

Bibliography 
 
 
 
 
 
 
 
 
 
 

Jet engines